Mothey Vedakumari M.A. is an Indian parliamentarian and singer.

She was born at Eluru, Andhra Pradesh on 24 September 1931. Her father is Mothey Narayana Rao.

She was secretary of the Students' Congress, Eluru. She was secretary, West Godavari Branch of All India Women's Conference. She has started an institution for giving free coaching to women in Hindi, tailoring, typewriting etc.

She was recognized by All India Radio as first-class artiste and broadcasts Carnatic music regularly.

She was elected to 2nd Lok Sabha from Eluru constituency in 1957 as a member of Indian National Congress.

References

India MPs 1957–1962
Indian National Congress politicians from Andhra Pradesh
1931 births
Living people
Lok Sabha members from Andhra Pradesh
People from Eluru
Women in Andhra Pradesh politics
20th-century Indian women politicians
20th-century Indian politicians
Women members of the Lok Sabha